"Per Sempre (For Always)" is the fourth and final single by Anthony Callea from his self-titled debut album Anthony Callea.

Track listing
CD single
 "Per Sempre (For Always)"
 "Per Sempre (For Always)" (live)
 "Don't Tell Me" (live)

DVD single
 "Per Sempre (For Always)" (live)
 "Per Sempre (For Always)" (video)
 "Per Sempre (For Always)" (album version audio)

Charts

References

2005 singles
Anthony Callea songs
Songs written by Steve Balsamo
2004 songs
Songs written by Anthony Callea